Yohan Jose Alana Pino (born December 26, 1983) is a Venezuelan-Colombian professional baseball pitcher for the Tommasin Padova of the Italian Baseball League. He has played in Major League Baseball (MLB) for the Minnesota Twins and Kansas City Royals, and in the KBO League for the KT Wiz.

Career

Minnesota Twins
Pino has played in the minor leagues for the Minnesota Twins, Cleveland Indians, Toronto Blue Jays and Cincinnati Reds organizations.

Pino signed with the Minnesota Twins before the 2014 season. He made his major league debut on June 19, 2014. At 30 years, 175 days, Pino is the oldest Twins starting pitcher to make his major league debut. Pino was optioned back to the AAA Rochester Red Wings on August 15, 2014, after making 10 starts and going 1-5 with a 5.37 ERA. After the season, Pino was outrighted off the Twins roster.

Kansas City Royals
Pino signed a major league deal with the Kansas City Royals on December 15, 2014. On April 18, 2015, the same day he was called up from Triple-A, he made his Royals debut, replacing starter Yordano Ventura after the latter was ejected in the fourth inning. He was optioned back to the minors on May 12, after he blew a hold opportunity on May 9 with a throwing error in the bottom of the ninth against the Detroit Tigers. On September 7, Pino was designated for assignment.

KT Wiz
Prior to the 2016 season, Pino signed with the KT Wiz of the KBO League.

Second Stint with Twins
On January 24, 2017, Pino signed a minor league contract with the Minnesota Twins. He elected free agency on November 6, 2017.

Tommasin Padova
On January 25, 2018, Pino signed with the Tommasin Padova of the Italian Baseball League.

See also
 List of Major League Baseball players from Venezuela

References

External links

 

1983 births
Living people
Akron Aeros players
Beloit Snappers players
Chattanooga Lookouts players
Columbus Clippers players
Elizabethton Twins players
Fort Myers Miracle players
Kansas City Royals players
KBO League pitchers
KT Wiz players
Las Vegas 51s players
Louisville Bats players
Major League Baseball pitchers
Major League Baseball players from Venezuela
Minnesota Twins players
New Britain Rock Cats players
New Hampshire Fisher Cats players
Omaha Storm Chasers players
Pensacola Blue Wahoos players
People from Turmero
Rochester Red Wings players
Tigres de Aragua players
Venezuelan expatriate baseball players in South Korea
Venezuelan expatriate baseball players in the United States
Venezuelan people of Colombian descent
2017 World Baseball Classic players
Venezuelan expatriate baseball players in Italy